The 2014–15 Northwestern State Lady Demons basketball team represented Northwestern State University during the 2014–15 NCAA Division I women's basketball season. The Demons, led by third year co-head coaches Brooke Stoehr and Scott Stoehr, played their home games at Prather Coliseum and were members of the Southland Conference. They finished the season 19–15, 10–8 in Southland play for a tie for a sixth-place finish. They were champions of the Southland Women's Basketball Tournament and received an automatic to the 2015 NCAA Division I women's basketball tournament. They lost to Baylor in the first round.

Roster

Media
Select Lady Demon basketball games can be listened to with a Northwestern feed at Demons Showcase. Many opponents have an audio stream available to listen to the games live that aren't done on Demons Showcase. NSU TV will also broadcast most of the Lady Demons wins tape delayed.

Schedule

|-
!colspan=9 style="background:#660099; color:#FFFFFF;"| Out of Conference Schedule

|-
!colspan=9 style="background:#660099; color:#FFFFFF;"| Southland Conference Schedule

|-
!colspan=9 style="background:#660099; color:#FFFFFF;"| Southland Conference tournament

|-
!colspan=9 style="background:#660099; color:#FFFFFF;"| NCAA Division I women's basketball tournament

See also
2014–15 Northwestern State Demons basketball team

References

Northwestern State
Northwestern State Lady Demons basketball seasons
Northwestern